Enskede-Årsta-Vantör (listen   ) is a borough (stadsdelsområde) in Söderort, the southern part of Stockholm, Sweden.

Overview
The districts that make up the borough are Enskedefältet, Enskede Gård, Gamla Enskede, Johanneshov, Stureby, Årsta, Östberga, Bandhagen, Högdalen, Örby, Rågsved and Hagsätra. The population  was 103,323.

The borough was formed in January 2007 from two older boroughs, Enskede-Årsta and Vantör.

Notable people
Johanna and Klara Söderberg, musicians
Janet Leon, former member of Play
Sanna Nielsen, musician
Janice Kavander, musician
Anders Ygeman, politician

References

External links

Boroughs of Stockholm